Peter (? – October 666) was the Ecumenical Patriarch of Constantinople from 654 to 666. He was condemned as a heretic in the Third Council of Constantinople.  He was succeeded as ecumenical patriarch by Thomas II of Constantinople.

Peter succeeded Patr. Pyrrhus who also was a Monothelite. In correspondence with Pope Vitalian of Rome following Vitalian's ascension to the see of Rome, Peter was noncommittal concerning Monothelitism, leading to a restoration of ecclesiastical intercourse between Rome and Constantinople. This resulted the addition of Vitalian's name on the diptychs of the church in Constantinople—the only name of a pope so entered between the reign of Pope Honorius I, who died in 638, and 677 when Patriarch Theodore I removed the pope's name prior to the Sixth Ecumenical Council. At the council Peter was condemned as a heretic along with Patriarchs Sergius I, Pyrrhus I and Paul II all of Constantinople, Patriarch Cyrus of Alexandria, and Theodore of Pharan.

References 

7th-century patriarchs of Constantinople